Resatorvid (TAK-242) is a drug which acts as a selective antagonist of the receptor TLR4. It has antiinflammatory and neuroprotective effects following brain injury, and also shows activity against some forms of skin cancer and some other cancers, and may show potential as an add-on treatment alongside conventional chemotherapy drugs.

See also
 M62812
 TLR4-IN-C34

References 

Receptor antagonists